Eberhard Wiese (born 3 August 1953) is an East German bobsledder who competed during the mid-1980s. He won a silver medal in the four-man event at the 1984 Winter Olympics in Sarajevo.

Wiese also earned a silver medal in the four-man event at the 1982 FIBT World Championships in St. Moritz.

References
 Boobsleigh four-man Olympic medalists for 1924, 1932–56, and since 1964
 Boobsleigh four-man world championship medalists since 1930

Bobsledders at the 1984 Winter Olympics
German male bobsledders
German male sprinters
Olympic bobsledders of East Germany
Olympic silver medalists for East Germany
Living people
1953 births
Olympic medalists in bobsleigh
Medalists at the 1984 Winter Olympics